Ede & Ravenscroft are the oldest tailors in London, established in 1689. They have two London premises, in Chancery Lane and Burlington Gardens, very close to the famous Savile Row. They make, sell and hire out legal gowns and wigs, clerical dress, civic and municipal robes, academic dress and other ceremonial and formal dress, and have shops in Oxford, Cambridge and Edinburgh.

The main (and historic) outlet and offices are at 93 Chancery Lane which, due to its proximity to the Inns of Court and the country's main civil and criminal law courts, is also the company's main outlet for legal dress.

History 

The company was founded in 1689 by William and Martha Shudall. The present name dates from 1902 and is a result of the inheriting of the business by Joseph Ede and then merging with wig-maker Ravenscroft.

The company holds royal warrants as robemakers to King Charles III, and previously to Elizabeth II and the Queen Mother. 

In addition to clothing and robes, Ede & Ravenscroft often supply photography at ceremonial events such as graduations and as tailor to the Bullingdon Club at the University of Oxford.

In Popular Culture 
The City Centre location on Oxford's High Street is featured in the song "Blackbird Leys" by New York City band Glenarvon.

References

Further reading

External links

 
 

Clothing companies based in London
Shops in London
Academic dress
Judicial clothing
Suit makers
Retail companies established in 1689
British Royal Warrant holders
Organisations based in London with royal patronage
Companies based in the London Borough of Camden
1689 establishments in England